Epicephala haplodoxa is a moth of the family Gracillariidae. It is known from South Africa and Mozambique.

References

Epicephala
Moths of Sub-Saharan Africa
Lepidoptera of Mozambique
Lepidoptera of South Africa
Moths described in 1961